The term discriminated union may refer to:

Disjoint union in set theory.
Tagged union in computer science.

Mathematics disambiguation pages